Purvis is a surname and occasionally a masculine given name which may refer to:

Surname
 Al Purvis (1929–2009), Canadian ice hockey player
 Arthur Blaikie Purvis (1890–1941), Canadian industrialist
 Bart Purvis (1919–2001), English footballer
 Bob Purvis (disambiguation), several people
Charles Burleigh Purvis (1842–1929), physician in Washington, D.C. and among the founders of the medical school at Howard University
 Dawn Purvis (born 1967), member of the Northern Ireland Assembly
 Duane Purvis (c. 1913–1989), All-American football player and track and field athlete
 Edward William Purvis (1857–1888), British officer and Hawaiian official
 François Pervis (born 1984), French track cyclist
Harriet Forten Purvis (1810–1875), African-American abolitionist and first generation suffragist
Harriet Purvis, Jr. (1839–1904), African-American abolitionist, suffragist and a member of the temperance movement
 Hugh Purvis (1843–1922), United States Marine who received the Medal of Honor
 Jack Purvis (actor) (1937–1997), British actor
 Jack Purvis (1906–1962), jazz musician
 Jeff Purvis (born 1959), race car driver
 Jeremy Purvis (born 1974), Scottish Member of Parliament
 Jim Purvis, American soccer player in the 1920s
 Jim Purvis (cricketer) (born 1954), former English cricketer
 John Purvis (disambiguation), several people
 Katharine Purvis (died 1909), writer of "When the Saints Go Marching in"
 Melvin Purvis (1903–1960), FBI agent
 Neal Purvis (born 1961), screenwriter
Perrin H. Purvis (1918–2004) American politician from Mississippi
 Richard Purvis (1913–1994), U. S. organist and composer
 Rosalie Purvis (born 1975), Dutch-U.S. theatre director
Robert Purvis (disambiguation), several people, including:
 Robert Purvis (1810–1898), American abolitionist
 Ryan Purvis (born 1986), National Football League player
Sarah Louisa Forten Purvis (1814–1883) was a poet and abolitionist.
 Stewart Purvis (born 1947), CEO ITN, British news provider
 T G Purvis (Thomas George; 1861–1933), marine artist
 Tom Purvis (1888–1959), painter, commercial poster artist
 William Purvis (disambiguation), several people

Given name
 Purvis Short (born 1957), American retired National Basketball Association player
 Purvis Young (1943–2010), African-American painter

Masculine given names